Majorda is a village in Salcete, Goa. It is located in South Goa district, north-west of Margão. The village is famous for its beaches.

Demographics
As of 2011 Indian census, Majorda had a population of 2,813. Males constitute 46% of the population and females 54%. Majorda has a literacy rate of 93.23%, higher than state average of 88.70%. Male literacy rate is 93.78%, and female literacy rate is 92.77%. In Majorda, 10.20% of the population is under 6 years of age.

Landmarks
Majorda has a railway station. The parish church of the village is Mãe de Deus (Mother Of God) Church.

References

Villages in South Goa district
Beaches of South Goa district
Beaches of Goa